The 2021 World Cadets Wrestling Championships (U17) was  World Cadets Wrestling Championship of combined events, and took place from June 19 to 25 in Budapest, Hungary.

Medal table

Team ranking

Medal summary

Men's freestyle

Men's Greco-Roman

Women's freestyle

References 

World Wrestling Cadet Championships
World Wrestling Cadet Championships
World Wrestling Cadet Championships
International wrestling competitions hosted by Hungary
International sports competitions in Budapest
World Cadet Wrestling Championships